Ccorpachico or Ccorpachico Hacienda (or Hacienda Ccorpachico) is a populated place in Puno Region, Peru.

See also
Azángaro
Juliaca
Lampa, Peru

References

Populated places in the Puno Region